Maris may refer to:

Personal names
Māris (name), a Latvian masculine given name, including a list of people with the name
Maris (given name), including a list of people and mythical or fictional characters
Maris (surname), including a list of people and fictional characters
Maris the Great, a promotional performance artist based in Denver, Colorado

Places
al-Maris in medieval Nubia
El Maris, Egypt
 Maris Nunatak, a small coastal nunatak in Antarctica
 Via Maris, a trade route dating from the early Bronze Age, linking Egypt with Iran, Iraq, Turkey and Syria
 Maris, the Latin name of the Mureș River, as mentioned by Herodotus in 484 BC

Mythology
Maris (mythology), an Etruscan god of agriculture

Other uses
 the Mari people
 MARIS Maritime Archeological Research Institute at Södertörn University, Sweden
 the planet Mars

See also
 Mares (disambiguation)
 Maris Otter, a variety of barley
 Maris Piper, Maris Peer and Maris Bard - varieties of potato
 Maris Wigeon, a variety of wheat
 Marris, a surname